Iniistius cyanifrons, is a species of marine ray-finned fish from the family Labridae, the wrasses, currently only known from the Indian Ocean.  

References

cyanifrons
Taxa named by Achille Valenciennes
Fish described in 1840